GuideWell, formally GuideWell Mutual Holding Corporation (holding company for Florida Blue), is a mutual insurance holding company primarily focused on health insurance in Florida. It was created in 2013 by a reorganization initiated by Florida Blue, a member company of the Blue Cross Blue Shield Association. By health insurance premiums written, it is 10th largest in providing health insurance in the United States with about $15b in health insurance sales.

History
It originally formed out of Florida Hospital Service Corporation founded in 1944, which became Blue Cross of Florida, and Florida Medical Services Corporation in 1946, which became Blue Shield of Florida. These merged in 1980 into Blue Cross and Blue Shield of Florida, which was renamed Florida Blue in 2012.

Subsidiaries 
The holding company controls corporations operating in insurance, health care providers, consumerism, and government.

References 

Financial services companies established in 1944
Companies based in Florida
Insurance companies of the United States
Members of Blue Cross Blue Shield Association